Apateum is a genus of beetles in the family Buprestidae, containing the following species:

 Apateum acuminatum Kerremans, 1898
 Apateum aeneipes Fairmaire, 1903
 Apateum ambiguum Thomson, 1878
 Apateum convexum (Laporte & Gory, 1836)
 Apateum cribristernum Fairmaire, 1903
 Apateum davidi Fairmaire, 1889
 Apateum differens Kerremans, 1903
 Apateum dissimilis Thomson, 1878
 Apateum donckieri Théry, 1905
 Apateum epigraptum Obenberger, 1942
 Apateum incongruum Thomson, 1878
 Apateum luczotii (Guérin-Méneville, 1833)
 Apateum opistograptis Obenberger, 1942
 Apateum plicifrons Fairmaire, 1903
 Apateum protasis Obenberger, 1942
 Apateum purpureiventre Fairmaire, 1899
 Apateum quadriplicatum Thomson, 1878
 Apateum semipolitum Fairmaire, 1903
 Apateum sexsulcatum Fairmaire, 1896
 Apateum similis Kerremans, 1903
 Apateum sordidum Théry, 1905
 Apateum viriditarsis (Laporte & Gory, 1836)
 Apateum waterhousei Kerremans, 1903
 Apateum xanthostictum fairmaire, 1896
 Apateum zivettum (Klug, 1833)
 Apateum zivettoides Fairmaire, 1889

References

Buprestidae genera